The canton of Plélo is an administrative division of the Côtes-d'Armor department, northwestern France. It was created at the French canton reorganisation which came into effect in March 2015. Its seat is in Plélo.

It consists of the following communes:
 
Boqueho
Bringolo
Châtelaudren-Plouagat
Cohiniac
Le Fœil
La Harmoye
Lanfains
Lanrodec
Le Leslay
Plaine-Haute
Plélo
Plerneuf
Plouvara
Quintin
Saint-Bihy
Saint-Brandan
Saint-Fiacre
Saint-Gildas
Saint-Jean-Kerdaniel
Saint-Péver
Trégomeur
Le Vieux-Bourg

References

Cantons of Côtes-d'Armor